Ethalia carneolata is a species of sea snail, a marine gastropod mollusk in the family Trochidae, the top snails.

Description
The height of the shell attains 4 mm, its diameter 7 mm. The smooth, little shell has a depressedly conical shape. It has a profound but narrow umbilicus. The shell contains 5 to 6 whorls that increase rapidly in size. They are separated by impressed sutures. The apex is minute. The body whorl is obtuse-angulate at the periphery. The aperture is round. The columellar margin contains a callus.
The colour of the shell is a pale carnation or flesh-colour in hue. Inside the aperture there is a deeper shade of the same colour, painted with fillets spirally or ochre-brown beaded with white.

Distribution
This marine species occurs off Mozambique and South Africa. It has also been reported in the Gulf of Oman. and off Sri Lanka.

References

 Herbert D.G. (1992). Revision of the Umboniinae (Mollusca: Prosobranchia: Trochidae) in southern Africa and Mozambique. Annals of the Natal Museum 33(2):379-459.

External links
 To Biodiversity Heritage Library (6 publications)
 To World Register of Marine Species
 

carneolata
Gastropods described in 1897